Falstone Bridge is a stone bridge across the River North Tyne at Falstone in Northumberland.

History
The bridge, which has three stone arches, was built by Henry Welch and completed in 1843. It is a Grade II listed structure. It formed an element of a toll road to Scotland.

References

Bridges in Northumberland
Crossings of the River Tyne
Grade II listed bridges
Grade II listed buildings in Northumberland